To Conquer Chaos is a 1964 science fiction novel by English writer John Brunner.

References

1964 British novels
1964 science fiction novels
British science fiction novels
Novels by John Brunner
Ace Books books